Stiphodon hydroreibatus is a species of goby found on the Samoa Archipelago and Futuna.
  
This species can reach a length of  SL.

References

hydroreibatus
Taxa named by Ronald E. Watson
Fish described in 1999